{{DISPLAYTITLE:C27H42O3}}
The molecular formula C27H42O3 (molar mass: 414.62 g/mol, exact mass: 414.3134 u) may refer to:

 Diosgenin
 Metenolone enanthate
 Yamogenin, a sapogenin found in fenugreek